This is the episode list of the cooking / informative television series Anna & Kristina's Grocery Bag which airs on W Network in Canada and OWN: The Oprah Winfrey Network in United States.

Series overview

The following premiere and finale dates are for the original broadcast on the W Network in Canada.

Episodes

Season 1 (2008–09)

Season 2 (2009)

Season 3 (2010–11)

Season 4 (2012–13)

Result summary

References

Lists of Canadian television series episodes